Pescatore is a surname meaning fisherman.

Pescatore may also refer to:
 Dal Pescatore, a restaurant in Canneto sull'Oglio, Italy
 "Il pescatore", a 1970 song by Fabrizio De André
 Palazzo Pescatore, a palace in St. Paul's Bay, Malta

See also
 Pescadore (disambiguation)
 Pescatoria, a genus of flowering plants from the orchid family Orchidaceae
 Pescatorio or Ring of the Fisherman, part of the regalia worn by the Pope